The Latvian Soviet Encyclopedia is a universal encyclopedia in Latvian in 10 volumes.

History 
The main part of the encyclopaedia was published in ten volumes from 1981 to 1988. The volume 52, Latvian SSR, was also published in Russian. A supplement was published in 1988.

The main editor was Pēteris Jērāns, and it was printed in Riga numbering 75,000 sets.

Content 
The encyclopedia contains around 60,000 articles, and includes around 20,000 illustrations and over 600 maps. It covers all branches of knowledge, with the expected ideological emphasis of publications originating in the Soviet bloc in the period.

Volumes

See also 

 Latvian National Encyclopedia

References 

Latvian encyclopedias
Latvian Soviet Socialist Republic
Latvian-language encyclopedias
1981 non-fiction books
20th-century encyclopedias
National Soviet encyclopedias